Saifuddin Saif (20 March 1922  12 July 1993) was a Pakistani lyricist, poet, film producer-director, and the founder of Rehnuma Films, a film studio of 1954. 

He was involved in writing poems and lyrics before and after the Partition. However, most of his films written before partition remained unreleased due to political instabilities in the subcontinent. He was best known for his film Kartar Singh, and is also credited for writing lyrics for Pakistan's historical and first-ever feature film Teri Yaad, which helped him to appear among the prominent writers.

As a poet, he wrote eleven gazals and four nazms on various subjects, including fifteen on friendship, fifteen on social, one on hope, and a poetic book titled Kham-e-Kakul, also known as Khan-e-Kamal (amazing ruler).

Early life and education
Saifuddin was born and raised in British Raj at Amritsar. He received his education from the Govt. M.A.O. College Lahore, but left midway after he was barred from taking part in board exams over joining political activism of the Khaksar Movement, a social movement aimed at freeing India from the British Empire.

Career
Saif started his career as a lyricist, but his childhood was originally associated with poetry writings and after leaving the college, he pursued poetry as a career. He migrated to Pakistan following the partition  and settled in Lahore where he initially worked as a dialogue writer and lyricist in the cinema of Pakistan. He later established Rahnuma Films, a full-fledged filmmaking production. He also wrote lyrics before partition, but none of the films was released. After his migration to Pakistan, all the films he worked for were released, and he was subsequently considered one of  the prominent filmmakers of Pakistan.

His first film as a lyricist was Hichkolay (1949), and later wrote songs for Amanat in 1950 and Naveli in 1952. His work for Ghulam and Mehbooba films of 1953 are generally recognized as his commercial success. After his commercial success, he established his film company called Rahnuma Films. He also worked as a producer, director and scriptwriter in Raat Ki Baat and Saath Lakh (1957), including Lollywood's historical film Kartar Singh (1959), which is claimed to have covered real events and bloodshed of the 1947 partition. He wrote "Payal Main Geet Hain Chham Chham Ke" song for film Gumnaam (1954) and also for film Qatil (1955).

Besides films, he primarily used to write poems which were sung by the prominent Pakistani singers, including Noor Jehan, Nusrat Fateh Ali Khan, and Mahdi Hasan. Saif wrote a book titled  Khan-e-Kamal, comprising a collection of gazals.

Work

Awards and recognition
Nigar Award for Saifuddin Saif as Best Script/Story Writer for film Saat Lakh (1957)
Nigar Award for Best Film Saat Lakh (1957)

Bibliography

Death 
Saifuddin Saif died on 12 July 1993 in Lahore, Pakistan and is buried near Model Town, Lahore cemetery. His life is covered in a MPhil thesis book titled Shair-e-Kujkulah by Robina Shaista.

References

External links 
 Saifuddin Saif on Rekhta Foundation
 

 

1922 births
1993 deaths
Indian emigrants to Pakistan
Pakistani male poets
Pakistani lyricists
Film directors from Lahore
Pakistani film producers
Nigar Award winners